Sweden participated in the Eurovision Song Contest 2013 with the song "You" written by Robin Stjernberg, Linnea Deb, Joy Deb and Joakim Harestad Haukaas. The song was performed by Robin Stjernberg. In addition to participating in the contest, the Swedish broadcaster Sveriges Television (SVT) also hosted the Eurovision Song Contest after winning the competition in 2012 with the song "Euphoria" performed by Loreen. SVT organised the national final Melodifestivalen 2013 in order to select the Swedish entry for the 2013 contest in Malmö. After a six-week-long competition consisting of four heats, a Second Chance round and a final, "You" performed by Robin Stjernberg emerged as the winner after achieving the highest score following the combination of votes from eleven international jury groups and a public vote.

As the host country, Sweden qualified to compete directly in the final of the Eurovision Song Contest. Sweden's running order position was determined by draw. Performing in position 16 during the final, Sweden placed fourteenth out of the 26 participating countries with 62 points.

Background 

Sweden had won the contest on five occasions: in 1974 with the song "Waterloo" performed by ABBA, in 1984 with the song "Diggi-Loo Diggi-Ley" performed by Herreys, in 1991 with the song "Fångad av en stormvind" performed by Carola, in 1999 with the song "Take Me to Your Heaven" performed by Charlotte Nilsson, and in 2012 with the song "Euphoria" performed by Loreen. Following the introduction of semi-finals for the 2004, Sweden's entries, to this point, have featured in every final except for 2010 when the nation failed to qualify.

The Swedish national broadcaster, Sveriges Television (SVT), broadcasts the event within Sweden and organises the selection process for the nation's entry. Since 1959, SVT has organised the annual competition Melodifestivalen in order to select the Swedish entry for the Eurovision Song Contest.

Before Eurovision

Melodifestivalen 2013 

Melodifestivalen 2013 was the Swedish music competition that selected Sweden's entry for the Eurovision Song Contest 2013. 32 competed in a six-week-long process which consisted of four heats on 2, 9, 16 and 23 February 2013, a second chance round on 2 March 2013, and a final on 9 March 2013. The six shows were hosted by Gina Dirawi and Danny Saucedo. Eight songs competed in each heat—the top two qualified directly to the final, while the third and fourth placed songs qualified to the second chance round. The bottom four songs in each heat were eliminated from the competition. An additional two songs qualified to the final from the second chance round. The results in the semi-finals and second chance round were determined exclusively by public televoting, while the overall winner of the competition was selected in the final through the combination of a public vote and the votes from eleven international jury groups. Among the competing artists was former Eurovision Song Contest contestant Tommy Körberg (participating as a member of Ravaillacz) who represented Sweden in 1969 and 1988.

Heats and Second Chance round 

 The first heat took place on 2 February 2013 at the Telenor Arena in Karlskrona. "Heartbreak Hotel" performed by Yohio and "Skyline" performed by David Lindgren qualified directly to the final, while "Burning Flags" performed by Cookies 'N' Beans and "Vi kommer aldrig att förlora" performed by Eric Gadd qualified to the Second Chance round. "Paris" performed by Jay-Jay Johanson, "Gosa" performed by Mary N'diaye, "Porslin" performed by Anna Järvinen, and "We're Still Kids" performed by Michael Feiner and Caisa were eliminated.
 The second heat took place on 9 February 2013 at the Scandinavium in Gothenburg. "Copacabanana" performed by Sean Banan and "Only the Dead Fish Follow the Stream" performed by Louise Hoffsten qualified directly to the final, while "Begging" performed by Anton Ewald and "Hello Goodbye" performed by Erik Segerstedt and Tone Damli qualified to the Second Chance round. "Make Me No 1" performed by Felicia Olsson, "Annelie" performed by Joacim Cans, "On Top of the World" performed by Swedish House Wives, and "En förlorad sommar" performed by Rikard Wolff feat. Sara Isaksson were eliminated.
 The third heat took place on 16 February 2013 at the Skellefteå Kraft Arena in Skellefteå. "En riktig jävla schlager" performed by Ravaillacz and "Falling" performed by State of Drama qualified directly to the final, while "In and Out of Love" performed by Martin Rolinski and "Hon har inte" performed by Caroline af Ugglas qualified to the Second Chance round. "Alibi" performed by Eddie Razaz, "Island" performed by Elin Petersson, "Dumb" performed by Amanda Fondell, and "Heartstrings" performed by Janet Leon were eliminated.
 The fourth heat took place on 23 February 2013 at the Malmö Arena in Malmö. "Tell the World I'm Here" performed by Ulrik Munther and "Bed on Fire" performed by Ralf Gyllenhammar qualified directly to the final, while "You" performed by Robin Stjernberg and "Jalla Dansa Sawa" performed by Behrang Miri feat. Loulou Lamotte and Oscar Zia qualified to the Second Chance round. "Rockin' the Ride" performed by Army of Lovers, "Must Be Love" performed by Lucia Piñera, "Trivialitet" performed by Sylvia Vrethammar, and "Breaking the Silence" performed by Terese Fredenwall were eliminated.
 The Second Chance round (Andra chansen) round took place on 2 March 2013 at the Löfbergs Lila Arena in Karlstad. "Begging" performed by Anton Ewald and "You" performed by Robin Stjernberg qualified to the final.

Final 
The final was held on 9 March 2013 at the Friends Arena in Stockholm. Ten songs competed—two qualifiers from each of the four preceding heats and two qualifiers from the Second Chance round. The combination of points from a viewer vote and eleven international jury groups determined the winner. The viewers and the juries each had a total of 473 points to award. The nations that comprised the international jury were Croatia, Cyprus, France, Germany, Iceland, Israel, Italy, Malta, Spain, The United Kingdom and Ukraine. "You" performed by Robin Stjernberg was selected as the winner with 166 points.

At Eurovision 

As the winner of the Eurovision Song Contest 2012 and host of the 2013 Contest, Sweden automatically qualified for a place in the final, held on 18 May 2013. In addition to their participation in the final, Sweden was assigned to vote in the first semi-final on 14 May 2013.

As the host nation, Sweden's running order position in the final was determined by draw, rather than being assigned by the producers of the show. On 18 March 2013 during the heads of delegation meeting, Sweden was drawn to perform 16th in the final. In the final, Sweden performed following United Kingdom and preceding Hungary. Sweden placed 14th in the final, scoring 62 points.

In Sweden, both the semi-finals and the final were broadcast on SVT1, with commentary provided by Josefine Sundström. The competition was also broadcast via radio on Sveriges Radio P4 with commentary by Carolina Norén for all three shows, Ronnie Ritterland for the semi-finals and Björn Kjellman for the grand final.

The national jury that provided 50% of the Swedish vote in the first semi-final and the final consisted of: Ralf Gyllenhammar (singer), Erik Rapp (singer), Daniel Breitholtz (A&R-manager at Sony BMG), Karin Gunnarsson (Sveriges Radio P3 editor) and Monika Starck (backing vocalist). The Swedish spokesperson in the grand final was Yohio.

The Swedish entry was awarded one of the three Marcel Bezençon Awards, which honour the best of the competing entries for the 2013 Contest in different areas of achievement. Sweden received the Composer Award, which was awarded to the best and most original composition as voted by the participating composers in the competition.

Voting

Points awarded to Sweden

Points awarded by Sweden

References

2013
Countries in the Eurovision Song Contest 2013
Eurovision
Eurovision